Salobrena is a genus of moths of the family Pyralidae. The genus was erected by Francis Walker in 1863.

Species
Salobrena cyrisalis H. Druce, 1895 Mexico
Salobrena dicela Dyar, 1914 Panama
Salobrena excisana Walker, 1863
Salobrena gibbosa (Felder & Rogenhofer, 1875) Colombia
Salobrena platybathyralis (Dyar, 1914) Panama
Salobrena propylea (H. Druce, 1895) Mexico
Salobrena recurvata (Möschler, 1886) Jamaica
Salobrena rubiginea (Hampson, 1897) Dominica
Salobrena sincera (Zeller, 1875) Texas
Salobrena toxocrossa (Meyrick, 1936) Venezuela

References

Chrysauginae